August Franz Josef Karl Mayer (2 November 1787 in Schwäbisch Gmünd – 9 November 1865 in Bonn) was a German anatomist and physiologist.

He received his education at the University of Tübingen, obtaining his doctorate in 1812. Afterwards, he worked as a prosector at the Academy of Bern, where in 1815 he was named a professor of anatomy and physiology. From 1819 to 1856 he was a professor at the University of Bonn. Among his better known students at Bonn were Johannes Peter Müller and Theodor Ludwig Wilhelm von Bischoff.

His name is associated with a female reproductive disorder known today as Mayer-Rokitansky-Küster-Hauser syndrome (MRKH); named in conjunction with Carl von Rokitansky, Hermann Küster and Georges André Hauser.

Selected works 
He was the author of around 145 published works, many of them written from the viewpoint of natural philosophy. 
 Ueber Histologie und eine neue Eintheilung der Gewebe des menschlichen Körpers, 1819 – On histology and a new division of tissues of the human body.
 Beschreibung einer graviditas interstitialis uteri, 1825.
 Supplemente zur Biologie des Blutes und des Pflanzensaftes, Book 1, 1827 – Supplements on the biology of the blood and of plant sap.
 Über Verdoppelungen des Uterus und ihre Arten, nebst Bemerkungen über Harenscharte und Wolfsrachen, 1829.
 Supplemente zur Lehre vom Kreislaufe, 1827 - Volume 1, 1835 – Supplements to the doctrine of circulation.
 Flimmerbewegungen, Leben der Blutsphären, Monadenlehre: 2, 1836.
 Die Metamorphose der Monaden, 1840 – The metamorphosis of monads.
 Beiträge zur anatomie der entozoen, 1841 – Contributions to the anatomy of Entozoa.
 Anatomische Untersuchungen über das Auge vom Walfisch, 1853 – Anatomical investigations on the eye of the whale.
 Ueber die Struktur der Häutedeckungen der Cetaceen, 1855 – On the structure of cetacean skin. 
 Zur Anatomie des Orang-Utang und des Chimpanse, 1856On the anatomy of the orang-utan and the chimpanzee 
 Ueber die fossilen Ueberreste eines menschlichen Schädels und Skeletes in einer Felsenhöhle des Düssel- oder Neander-Thales, 1864 – Concerning the fossil remains of a human skull and skeleton in a cave of the Düssel or Neander valley.

References 

1787 births
1865 deaths
German anatomists
German physiologists
People from Schwäbisch Gmünd
University of Tübingen alumni
Academic staff of the University of Bern
Academic staff of the University of Bonn